QuackShot Starring Donald Duck (also simply known as QuackShot), released in Japan as QuackShot Gurujia-ō no Hihō (QuackShot グルジア王の秘宝, QuackShot The Treasure of the King Garuzia), is a 1991 platforming video game developed and published by Sega for the Sega Genesis. The game was released in Europe in 1991, in North America on December 19, 1991, and in Japan the following day. QuackShot stars Donald Duck and his three nephews, Huey, Dewey, and Louie, as treasure-hunters. The game was influenced by the Indiana Jones film series.

QuackShot was released mostly with positive reviews from video game journalists. The game was universally lauded for its graphics, with magazines like Sega Pro describing them as "some of the best graphics around". The game was also praised for its music and puzzles. However, QuackShot was criticized for its controls, being described by IGN as "float-y" and making certain segments of the game unnecessarily difficult. The game was also criticized for its lack of difficulty overall as well as its lack of speech samples, which several other Genesis games of the time had.

Gameplay

The player, as Donald, ventures through a variety of side-scrolling levels. Generally, each level is divided into an overland part and a dungeon, such as the Maharajah's palace or the temple in which the Great Duck Treasure resides. Although the player may choose any order to play the overland sections, various obstacles prevent the player from entering the dungeons outside a specific order. In addition to this, some levels provide the player with vital clues which solve puzzles needed to progress in later sections. Once Donald has completed the overland section of an area, he may leave by calling his nephews' biplane, and will return to the dungeon entrance of that area if the player chooses to return.

Donald is armed with a special gun that can shoot plungers, popcorn or bubble gum. Donald has unlimited plungers which can temporarily stun enemies (though bosses can still be damaged with plungers), and can collect popcorn and gum along the way or get the latter from Gyro Gearloose. Later in the game, the plunger is upgraded to act as a temporary platform to climb walls with and, when stuck to a passing bird, allows Donald to traverse longer distances. In the overland sections of Duckburg, India, and Egypt, Donald can also pick up chili peppers which increase his temper, eventually temporarily activating a "quack attack" mode that allows him to become invincible, automatically run forward and knock out enemies in his path.

Plot
While Donald is flipping through some books in Scrooge McDuck's library, a map falls out of a book relating to the treasure of King Garuzia, ruler of the Great Duck Kingdom in ancient times. The map leads to the location of the king's most prized possession, hidden in a secret place shortly before his death. Donald thinks this is his path to riches. Unfortunately Big Bad Pete overhears and pursues Donald throughout the game hoping to steal the treasure.

Teamed with his nephews Huey, Dewey, and Louie, and using the partial map from the library, Donald begins his search in Duckburg, with the trail being directed to an Aztec pyramid in Mexico. Outside the pyramid, he is directed by a "sweet seniorita" to obtain a "hero key" from an explorer back in Duckburg to open the pyramid. Inside the pyramid, Donald meets Goofy, who gives him a strange note and a plunger to help him reach higher places, and tells him that Gyro Gearloose is looking for him back in Duckburg. Travelling across the rooftops of Duckburg to meet Gyro, Donald is given Gyro's latest invention, bubblegum ammo that can break through walls. The last location on the partial map is Count Dracula's castle in Transylvania, where Donald encounters a ghost who tells him that the Count carries the real treasure map.

After defeating Dracula, Donald receives a more complete map. In India, Donald enters the palace of the Maharajah, where she challenges him to defeat the tiger (known as Shere Khan) in her garden in exchange for a Sphinx Tear. Donald succeeds and receives the Sphinx Tear, which is the key to opening a temple in Egypt. Donald is able to solve the "Riddle of the Sphinx" using the note Goofy had given him and obtains the Scepter of Ra before escaping in a minecart. From there, he journeys to the South Pole, where he finds a key frozen in ice, and uses the Scepter of Ra to melt the ice and grab the key. The key unlocks the hold of a Viking ship, which contains an ancient diary with the secret to locating the treasure. The ship is haunted by ghosts, and the Viking captain sends Donald below decks to get rid of them. After defeating a skeletal Viking warrior, Donald returns to the deck, where the captain informs him that the diary is hidden in ice near the South Pole, and gives him an "ancient Viking plunger" that attaches to flying creatures. Donald then returns to the South Pole, hitching a ride on one of Pete's bird minions to reach the diary.

However, upon finding the diary, Pete shows up, holding Donald's nephews hostage in exchange for the diary. After giving Pete the diary, Donald travels to Pete's hideout to defeat Pete and get the diary back. The diary reveals that the map, when dipped in water, will reveal the location of the Great Duck Treasure. Donald flies to the island where the treasure is hidden and manages to evade its traps in order to reach the treasure vault. After defeating the elderly knight guarding the treasure, Donald opens the vault only to find a simple stone statue. When the disappointed Donald returns home, Huey, Dewey, and Louie accidentally break the statue, which reveals a golden jeweled necklace was hidden inside. Donald gives the necklace to Daisy and the two fly off into the sunset together.

Development and release
QuackShot was developed and published by Sega for the Sega Genesis. In May 1991, Sega presented the game at the Consumer Electronics Show. The game was released in Europe in 1991, in North America on December 19, 1991 and in Japan the following day. QuackShot was released as part of a bundle called The Disney Collection for Genesis in 1996 alongside Castle of Illusion. The game was also ported to the Sega Saturn and released exclusively in Japan alongside Castle of Illusion again as part of the Sega Ages series in 1998, entitled Sega Ages: I Love Mickey Mouse.

Reception

In the United Kingdom, QuackShot was the top-selling Mega Drive game upon release.

QuackShot received a mostly positive response from critics upon release. GameRankings, an aggregator for video game reviews, assigned the game a score of 77% based on 2 reviews. MegaTech magazine praised the game's graphics, but criticized the game's easiness. Damian Butt from Sega Pro also praised the graphics, and noted the game's various puzzles, explaining that "[e]ven if the ideas are not original, the way they are strung together to accelerate the pace to overload is nothing short of breath-taking". Levi Buchanan from IGN gave QuackShot a 7.3/10, also lauding the graphics and animation as excellent and saying the music was pleasing.

Butt criticized Donald's controls in certain situations in the game, as well as the difficulty of some levels and puzzles. Buchanan also criticized the controls, calling them "float-y" and noted the difficulty in executing precision jumps, explaining that "[i]t's far too easy to over- or under-shoot a narrow column and slip to your doom". Butt was also "dubious of the number of credits", stating that the game may seem easy with unlimited continues, but that the player will "still need considerable skill to reach the treasure island". Buchanan was disappointed with the lack of speech samples, explaining that it's "a bit of a drag with a character that is so defined by his voice". Ultimately, Butt said that "[y]ounger players will instantly be enthralled by Donald's quest" and that "QuackShot is everything a cartoon game should be and more". Buchanan summed up the game as being a "good platformer tripped up by some questionable controls" and recommended the game as "a mildly enjoyable 16-bit platformer that would fit nicely in your Genesis collection".

Entertainment Weekly gave the game an A and wrote: "What does this action game have in common with classic 1950s Disney cartoons? The completely deranged hero. During the Donald's 'quack attacks', the feathers practically fly off the screen and into your lap".

Mega placed the game at #7 in their "Top Mega Drive Games of All Time" list. In 2017, Gamesradar ranked the game 28th on its "Best Sega Genesis/Mega Drive games of all time".

See also
World of Illusion
Illusion (series)
List of Disney video games

References

External links

1991 video games
Disney video games
Donald Duck video games
Metroidvania games
Platform games
Sega video games
Sega Genesis games
Sega Saturn games
Video games set in Antarctica
Video games set in Egypt
Video games set in Norway
Video games set in Romania
Video games set in India
Video games set in Mexico
Video games set on islands
Side-scrolling platform games
Video games developed in Japan